Ispup (English: Spoof) is a sketch comedy show produced by ABC which features parodies of several Philippine television shows, films and advertisements with actors impersonating notable personalities such as Joseph Estrada, Gloria Macapagal Arroyo and Cardinal Jaime Sin, among others.

The show was originally aired on Saturdays, began on March 20, 1999, replacing Tropang Trumpo and moved to Fridays on November 23, 2001, to compete with Bubble Gang. On March 16, 2003, the show was re-introduced as Ispup Atbp. and moved to Sundays, taking over the former timeslot of The Price is Right. The program ended its almost 5-year run on February 15, 2004, and was replaced by the PBA coverage on ABC.

The program was known for its extensive use of political satire and parodies poking fun at various aspects of Filipino and occasionally foreign pop culture, solely focusing on the popularity and sometimes notoriety of celebrities, television shows, and political figures.

Cast

Main cast
 Willie Nepomuceno
 Leo Martinez (2000–2004)
 Candy Pangilinan
 Jon Santos

Extended cast
 Caloy Alde
 Mystica (2000–2003)
 Madeleine Nicholas
 Rufa Mae Quinto (1999–2001)
 Raffy Rodriguez
 Marissa Sanchez
 Selina Sevilla
 Joy Viado
 Angel Locsin (2002)
 Dingdong Avanzado
 Laarni Rivera

The Ispupniks
 Mike "Pekto" Nacua (who was later discovered by GMA Network as one of its comedians)
 Marvin Martinez a.k.a. Ate Shawie (gay impersonator of Sharon Cuneta)
 Manuel Papillera a.k.a. Ate Guy (gay impersonator of Nora Aunor)
 Hyubs Azarcon
 Cynthia Marquez

Guest casts
 Joji Isla
 Pepe Pimentel
 Onyok Velasco
 Khalil Kaimo
 Snooky Serna
 Dominic Ochoa

Parodies
Before and after the show's duration, a disclaimer was presented in the style of the Star Wars opening crawl to the music of Carl Orff's Carmina Burana, stating that the parodies were taken from television shows, commercials, and movies with permission, ending up as the show's tagline: "Walang pikunan, ispup onli." which literally translate into "Do not be offended, it's only a spoof."
 Alam Morena Clara - a parody of the telenovela Morena Clara
 Ang Sangang Daan (English: The Branched-Out Path) - a parody of religious program Ang Dating Daan and its rival Ang Tamang Daan, hosted by John Lapus and Leo Martinez
 Balitang Ka!/Balitang Y2K - a parody of ABS-CBN public affairs program Balitang K
 Bituin La Fea - a parody of the columbian telenovela Betty, La Fea
Blick - a parody of GMA youth-oriented show Click
 The Cheapest Link - a parody of the Philippine version of the UK game show The Weakest Link, having Leo Martinez as Dudes and actors playing political figures as contestants.
 Chugilita - a parody of the telenovela Chabelita portrayed by Rufa Mae Quinto
 Crispy Per Minute - a parody of ABS-CBN showbiz-oriented show Cristy Per Minute (the latter became a radio program, which currently airs over Radyo Singko 92.3 News FM).
 ‘Di Bati sina Mards at Pards - a parody of the GMA public affairs program Debate with Mare at Pare
 Empty V/NTV - a parody of the music channel MTV
 Familiar Feud - parody of the Philippine version of US game show Family Feud which was aired on the same network, ABC 5 in 2001–2003, GMA in 2008–2011, and ABS-CBN in 2016–2017.
 Gay KNB? - a parody of ABS-CBN game show Game KNB? hosted by Ms. Kris Pepino (played by Candy Pangilinan)
 Intrigador - a parody of GMA public affairs program Imbestigador
 Kirira: Ano ang Kulay ng Pinipig? - a parody of TAPE Inc. and GMA's teledrama Kirara: Ano Ang Kulay ng Pag-ibig?
 Knowless Power - a parody of the late Ernie Baron's Knowledge Power
 Lagot Ka Kay Tolfu! - a parody of RPN public affairs program Isumbong Mo Kay Tulfo
 Magandang Gabi Ba 'Yan - a parody of ABS-CBN magazine program Magandang Gabi, Bayan.
 Magpalakad-lakad man - a spoof anthology segment of GMA show Magpakailanman
 Malala Na Kaya - another spoof anthology segment of ABS-CBN show Maalaala Mo Kaya hosted by Charing Todos Los Santos Conscious na Conscious (played by Jon Santos)
 Master Siopao - a parody of GMA late night variety show Master Showman Presents.
 Medyo Alas Singko Y Medya -a parody of ABS-CBN morning show Alas Singko Y Medya.
 MKB - a parody of ABS-CBN noontime variety show MTB.
 Morning Gays - a parody of ABS-CBN talk show Morning Girls.
 Mula Sa Pusa - a parody of ABS-CBN teleserye Mula sa Puso.
 Munch - a parody of the GMA talk show Brunch.
 No One Can Be A Millionaire? - a parody of the Philippine version of the UK game show Who Wants to Be a Millionaire?, having Leo Martinez as Royet de Leon and actors playing political figures as contestants. Obviously, there was no million-peso winner as the segment title suggests. (Note: This parody was presented as a response of growing popularity of the game show in 2000. Only 6–7 years after the IBC version of "Millionaire's" last episode, a new format was launched in the same station (as TV5) with Vic Sotto as host.)
 Oka-Toka-Doc - a cross-over parody of ABS-CBN shows !Oka Tokat and Oki Doki Doc
 Palpakners Jay and Mel - a parody of GMA Sunday talk show Partners Mel and Jay
 Palso: Action Balita - a parody of ABS-CBN newscast Pulso: Aksyon Balita]
 Pangako Sa Yo Sa Puso Ko Iibigan Kita Hanggang Sa Dulo ng Walang Hanggan - a cross-over parody of three ABS-CBN teleseryes.
 Pinoy Over Exposed - a parody of ABS-CBN reality show Pinoy Exposed.
 The Priest is Right - a parody of the Philippine version of the US game show The Price Is Right which was aired on the same network, ABC 5 in 2001–2003, and ABS-CBN in 2011, having Willie Nepomuceno as His Eminems Jaime Cardinal Sins and actors playing political figures as contestants.
 Pulpol - a parody of ABS-CBN telemagazine show Pipol
 Rosalinta - a parody of Rosalinda played by Rufa Mae Quinto impersonating Thalía.
 Sailor Quarter Moon - a parody of the  Japanese superheroine anime Sailor Moon
 Sports Ang Limited - a parody of ABS-CBN sports program Sports Unlimited.
 StarTruck - a parody of GMA talent search program StarStruck
 Stirtalk - a parody of GMA showbiz-oriented show Startalk.
 Taksil! - a parody of GMA newscast Saksi
 Today with K - a parody of ABS-CBN talk show Today with Kris Aquino
 Usapang Monkey Business - a parody of ABS-CBN public affairs program Usapang Business
 The Tooth But Nothing the Tooth - parody of entertainment talk show The Truth But Nothing the Truth by Inday Badiday
 What if... - a spoof where different personalities would be like.
 Wheel of Misfortune or Will of Fortune - parody of the Philippine version of Wheel of Fortune which was aired on the same network, ABC 5 in 2001–2002, and ABS-CBN in 2008.
 Wrong Page: Ulat ni Mel Tiongke - a parody of GMA newscast Frontpage: Ulat ni Mel Tiangco
 Several commercial parodies

Lucky Me!, a popular noodle brand, and Gilbey's Gin also sponsored spoof portions of this program with permission. As a result of growing popularity, Gilbey's Gin and Ispup made a promo for the best Gilbey's spoof in 2002.

Impersonations
Kurita Chances - from ABS-CBN presenter Korina Sanchez, played by Rufa Mae Quinto
Royet de Leon - from Christopher de Leon, played by Leo Martinez
Mike Enrequiestas - from broadcaster Mike Enriquez, played by Leo Martinez. The surname may be a reference to the late comedian Rene Requiestas
Osang Enriques - from GMA News reporter Susan Enriquez, played by Mystica. The name "Osang" as refers to Rossana Roces
Sherap Entrada - from deposed Philippine president and former Manila city mayor Joseph Estrada, played by Willie Nepomuceno, and later Jon Santos
Kirira - from Philippine drama Kirara, played by Candy Pangilinan
Senator Koren or Loren Lagarista - from Senator Loren Legarda.
Cong. Manhik-Manaog - a character popularized by Leo Martinez, who used to be a co-star to Mr. Shooli (played by Jun Urbano) in Mongolian Barbecue, was reprised in Ispup through the Barangay Gaya-gaya segment
Ka Hermie Barong - from weather anchor Ernie Baron, played by Caloy Alde
Edu Manzanas or Dudes - from Edu Manzano, played by Leo Martinez.
Ches Melon- from ABS-CBN News anchor Ces Oreña-Drilon, played by Candy Pangilinan
Tita Cory Pepino - from president Corazon Aquino, played by Madeleine Nicolas
Kris Pepino - from Kris Aquino, played by Rufa Mae Quinto, later replaced by Candy Pangilinan after Quinto left the show for Bubble Gang in 2001.
Ramon Revillame or Bong Gabilla - from former action star and senator Ramon Revilla. The surname may be a reference to Willie Revillame
Charing Todos Los Santos Conscious na Conscious - from TV executive Charo Santos-Concio, played by Jon Santos
David Semplang - from Battle of the Brains presenter and current ANC anchor David Celdran, played by Jon Santos
His Eminems Jaime Cardinal Sins - from Cardinal Jaime Sin.
Mel Tiongke - from GMA News anchor Mel Tiangco, played by Candy Pangilinan
Mayor Vi - from actress and Batangas representative Vilma Santos, played by Jon Santos
Bogie Molcasid - from Ogie Alcasid played by Leo Martinez
Gloring Macabagal-Barroyo - from President Gloria Macapagal Arroyo played by Candy Pangilinan
Nur Miswa - from MNLF chair Nur Misuari played by Willie Nepomuceno
Inday Garutay - from impersonator of Inday Badiday
Hairy Potter - from the movie character Harry Potter played by Khali Kaimo.

Anniversary Editions
Gawad Yarian Awards - 1st Anniversary. A special is a parody of Gawad Urian.
Ispup Power 2 - 2nd Anniversary. A special is the parody of People Power 2 against the ousted president Joseph Estrada.
Ispup KNB? - 3rd Anniversary. A special features the parodies of the several Game Shows aired on Philippine Television.

See also
 List of programs aired by TV5 (Philippine TV network)

References

1999 Philippine television series debuts
2004 Philippine television series endings
1990s Philippine television series
Philippine television sketch shows
TV5 (Philippine TV network) original programming
Filipino-language television shows
Political satirical television series